The Hub of Hubbard is an album by trumpeter Freddie Hubbard. It was recorded at Villingen, Black Forest, Germany on December 9, 1969. It was released on the MPS label and features performances by Hubbard, Eddie Daniels, Sir Roland Hanna, Richard Davis and Louis Hayes.

Track listing
 "Without a Song" (Edward Eliscu, Billy Rose, Vincent Youmans) - 12:50
 "Just One of Those Things" (Cole Porter) - 7:14
 "Blues for Duane" (Freddie Hubbard) - 7:32
 "The Things We Did Last Summer" (Sammy Cahn, Jule Styne) - 7:19
 "Muses for Richard Davis" (Hanna) - 5:49 Bonus track on CD reissue

Personnel
Freddie Hubbard - trumpet
Eddie Daniels - tenor saxophone
Roland Hanna - piano
Richard Davis - bass
Louis Hayes - drums

References

1970 albums
Freddie Hubbard albums
MPS Records albums